Prilike is a village located in the municipality of Ivanjica, Serbia. According to the 2011 census, the village has a population of 1,311 inhabitants.

Gallery

References

Populated places in Moravica District